A Primary Marksmanship Instructor is a United States Marine Corps specialty (MOS 0931) and acts as an instructor to other Marines on how to precisely fire the M16 rifle used as the standard weapon in the Marine Corps. Instructors also train Marines in use of the M9 pistol. Marksmanship Instructors instruct in all phases of the Marine Corps Marksmanship Program on the qualification and requalification on small arms ranges. Additionally, they assist in the operation of firing ranges.

See also
 List of weapons of the United States Marine Corps

External links
 Enlisted Job Descriptions: MOS 8531, Marksmanship Instructor - about.com

United States Marine Corps personnel